KANA Software, Inc. is a wholly owned subsidiary of Verint Systems (NASDAQ: VRNT) and provides on-premises and cloud computing hosted customer relationship management software products to many of the Fortune 500, mid-market businesses and government agencies.

History
Mark Gainey founded KANA, named after a rescued Shepherd-Husky mix, in 1996. The purpose was to market a software package designed to help businesses manage email and Web-based communications. It grew around this core offering.

In 1999, KANA Communications (as it was then known) acquired Connectify followed by Business Evolution and NetDialog.

In 2000, KANA made its then-largest acquisition, Silknet Software. The purchase price was $4.2 billion, despite the fact that both companies were relatively small. Silknet was an early  multichannel marketing software company. Industry analysts were generally cool to the purchase though some said it made sense strategically.

In 2001, KANA merged with BroadBase software.  KANA was a major stock market success during the dot-com bubble, and while it contracted significantly during the following downturn, it remained in business as an independent company through the following decade.

In 2010, Accel-KKR acquired KANA's assets and liabilities for approximately $40.82 million.  The same year, KANA acquired Lagan Technologies, a government-to-citizen customer relationship management company based in Northern Ireland. The software was rebranded as LAGAN Enterprise, a package that compiles information from sources such as 311 calls and map overlays to improve resource management.

In 2011, KANA purchased Overtone, which allowed companies to monitor social media outlets like Facebook, Twitter and LinkedIn. The software was rebranded as KANA Experience Analytics.

In 2012, KANA bought Trinicom, a Dutch company that makes mid-market customer service multichannel ecommerce, especially in the BeNeLux region. Less than three months later, KANA purchased Sword Ciboodle, a company that specializes in contact center software. Industry analysts generally looked favorably on the acquisition; Ciboodle's established business process management  gave KANA products for a full-featured CRM package for customer service with social media marketing. "Between the two companies, almost every aspect of customer relationship experience... is covered."  The combined organization operates under the KANA brand. Ciboodle's CEO, Mike Hughes, who had led the company prior to its purchase by Sword, left the company after KANA's purchase was finalized. He was replaced by KANA executives.

In 2013, KANA announced the KANA Enterprise product which the company marketed as "a unified platform supporting both agent-based and customer self-service scenarios".

In 2014, Verint acquired the operating assets of KANA for $514 million.

Product families
KANA Enterprise: Enterprise omni-channel CRM package
LAGAN Enterprise: G2C enterprise CRM package
KANA Express: Cloud-based multichannel customer service system

References

1996 establishments in California
American companies established in 1996
Software companies based in the San Francisco Bay Area
Companies based in Sunnyvale, California
Software companies established in 1996
2014 mergers and acquisitions
Customer relationship management software companies
Defunct software companies of the United States